The Swedish Society of Composers ('Föreningen Svenska Tonsättare', 'FST') is a professional organization based in Stockholm, Sweden, representing Swedish composers of contemporary classical music. It was founded in 1918 and today has 370 members, of which 347 are composers. The president is Martin Q Larsson, since 2010.

The FST is represented in national boards and institutions within the Swedish art music field. It was the FST that in 1923 founded STIM, in order to collect license fees when musical works are performed in public, broadcast or transmitted, and to pay out performing royalties.

The Nordic cooperation within 'Nordic Composers Council' is very active. Swedish Society of Composers is also internationally represented in ECSA – European Composer and Songwriter Alliance, ECF (European Composers Forum) and FFACE (Federation of Film & Audiovisual Composers of Europe).

External links
 —Official Swedish Society of Composers webpage

.
Contemporary classical music in Sweden
Contemporary music organizations
Organizations based in Stockholm
Arts organizations based in Europe
Arts organizations established in 1918
1918 establishments in Sweden
Classical music in Sweden
Music organizations based in Sweden